Black Power is a prominent gang in New Zealand. Members are predominantly Māori and Polynesian.

History
It was formed as the "Black Bulls" by Reitu Harris and Māori youth in Wellington about 1970, but was changed to Black Power in 1971. The gang was founded in response to the rival Mongrel Mob gang and white power associated gangs. The gang then spread to other major centres and rural towns throughout New Zealand.

Founder Reitu Harris was very politically aware, and during the early 1980s the gang gained some credibility; with social activist Denis O'Reilly joining, former judge Bill Maung acting as their political advisor and Prime Minister Robert Muldoon meeting with them and helping them to find accommodation and form work trusts.

The gang is now heavily involved in organised crime, such as drug manufacturing and dealing. While the gang has distanced itself from violent acts of some of its members, for example, a child abuse case, police have in return accused the gang members of using violence as a 'learned behaviour from involvement in the gang'.

There were 697 members in prison in April 2013.

The Black Power gang also has a strong presence on the Gold Coast of Queensland in Australia.

Insignia
Black Power colours are predominantly blue and black. The patches usually feature a clenched fist which is a symbol of the American Black Power movement. The patch will also be tattooed on the member's body.

See also

 Gangs in New Zealand
 Black Power
 Mongrel Mob

References

External links
Images of Black Power gang from the collection of the Museum of New Zealand Te Papa Tongarewa

Black Power
Gangs in New Zealand
Māori gangs
Polynesian gangs